Isaac M. Cravath (February 14, 1826May 4, 1872) was a Michigan politician.

Early life and career 
Cravath was born in New York, and at some point in his life moved to Michigan. Cravath once worked as a clerk in the Michigan Auditor General's office. Cravath was sworn in as member of the Michigan Senate from the 21st district on January 4, 1871. On May 4, 1872, he died of kidney disease while in office.

References

1826 births
1872 deaths
Members of the Michigan House of Representatives
19th-century American politicians